Thoran (pronounced ; or upperi in  Northern Kerala is a class of dry vegetable dishes combined with coconut that originated in the Indian state of Kerala. This common dish is usually eaten with rice and curry and is also part of the traditional Keralite sadhya.

Preparation 
Thoran is a dry dish traditionally made of finely chopped vegetables such as cabbage, yardlong bean and other bean varieties, unripe jackfruit, bittergourd (കയ്പ്പക്ക/പാവയ്‌ക്ക) or elephant foot yam, of leaves such as green or red spinach(Spinach, ചീര), Moringa oleifera or Ipomoea aquatica, as well as of flowers such as Moringa oleifera or Sesbania grandiflora.

The chopped vegetable is mixed together with grated coconut, mustard seeds, curry leaves and turmeric powder and briefly stirred on a pan over a hot fire.

Variants 
Thoran can be also made with carrots, green beans, cabbage, green tomatoes or spinach, vegetables that were traditionally not available in Kerala. The traditional recipes made in southern Kerala do not use garlic, but in the present day, garlic and onion are also added.

See also
 Cuisine of Kerala
 Poduthol
 Sadhya

References

External links

Kerala cuisine
Indian vegetable dishes
Vegan cuisine
South Indian cuisine
Vegetarian dishes of India